Avent is a surname. Notable people with the surname include:

Anthony Avent (born 1969), American basketball player
Elliott Avent, American baseball coach
Mayna Treanor Avent (1868–1959), American painter
Randy Avent, American engineer
Roxanne Avent (born 1976), American film producer
Tony Avent, American horticulturist